Samuel Weider Salus (August 31, 1872December 29, 1945) was an American lawyer and politician.

Born in Philadelphia, Pennsylvania, Salus graduated from Central High School in 1891. In 1895, Salus graduated from University of Pennsylvania Law School. He practiced law in Philadelphia and was involved with the Republican Party. In 1902 and 1903, Salus served on the Philadelphia City Council. He served as an assistant district for Philadelphia County, Pennsylvania from 1904 to 1907. From 1911 to 1938, Salus served in the Pennsylvania State Senate for the 2nd district from 1911 to 1937 and served as president pro tempore of the state senate from 1925 to 1938. Then, from 1903 to 1905, 1909 to 1911, and from 1943 until his death in 1945, Salus served in the Pennsylvania House of Representatives. Salus died in Philadelphia at his home after being ill for three months.  He is interred at the Adath Jeshurun Cemetery in Philadelphia, Pennsylvania.

Personal life
Salus was married to Ada Rosenthal.

References

External links

1872 births
1945 deaths
Central High School (Philadelphia) alumni
Lawyers from Philadelphia
Republican Party members of the Pennsylvania House of Representatives
Republican Party Pennsylvania state senators
Philadelphia City Council members
Politicians from Philadelphia
University of Pennsylvania Law School alumni
Burials in Pennsylvania